David Game College  is a private school and sixth form based in Tower Hill, London. The college is coeducational and admits students between the ages of 13–22. Up to 400 students take full-time courses each year.

The college is associated with the CIFE group of independent colleges and promotes an ethos of optimism, hard work and ambition to improve grades and enter a university of the student's choice. 67% of A Level graduates gained entry to Russel Group universities in 2017–2018. David Game College is rated as Outstanding in all areas in its latest Ofsted inspection.

History 
The college was founded by its still current principal David Game in 1974.  The college was originally started with five rooms in a basement; today it is one of the largest independent colleges in the UK. The college has undergone a multi-million pound renovation move to Tower Hill in May 2017.

Courses of study 
The college offers a number of educational courses including: A Levels, GCSEs, University Foundation Programmes, Higher Education, Easter Revision and Private Tuition as well as English, Russian and Spanish Foreign Language Courses.

Accreditation 
The college is inspected by Ofsted, the Government body responsible for monitoring standards in education. In its most recent inspection the teaching, pupil's achievements and behaviour was described as Outstanding in all five areas in its latest inspection.

The college has also been awarded Tier 4 Sponsor status by the UK Visas and Immigration (UKVI).

See also 
David Game College Group

References

External links 
 Official website

Private schools in the City of London
Educational institutions established in 1974
1974 establishments in England